Love Is an Awful Thing is a 1922 American silent comedy film directed by Victor Heerman and starring Owen Moore, Marjorie Daw, and Katherine Perry.

Plot
As described in a film magazine review, Anthony Churchill is to marry Helen after six months probation to convince her father Judge Griggs that he is a proper young man when Marion turns up some of Anthony's old love letters. To put her off, Anthony assumes the role of a married man with six children, but Marion discovers the hoax. Helen runs into a scene with Anthony with his made-up family. Complications ensue and it appears that the marriage will be wrecked when it is discovered that Marion is married to her attorney and the two were involved in hatching a blackmail scheme. This discovery proves removes all difficulties and paves the way to a happy, wedded ending.

Cast

References

Bibliography
 Munden, Kenneth White. The American Film Institute Catalog of Motion Pictures Produced in the United States, Part 1. University of California Press, 1997.

External links

 

1922 films
1920s English-language films
American silent feature films
Silent American comedy films
American black-and-white films
Films directed by Victor Heerman
Selznick Pictures films
1922 comedy films
1920s American films